"Only the Lonely" is a 1960 song by Roy Orbison.

Only the Lonely may also refer to:

 Only the Lonely (film), a 1991 romantic comedy-drama
 "Only the Lonely" (Forever Knight), a television episode
 Only the Lonely: Roy Orbison's Life and Legacy, a 1989 biography of Roy Orbison by Alan Clayson

Music
 Only the Lonely, an album by Colony House, 2017
 Only the Lonely (EP), or the title song (see below), by Unkle, 2011
 "Only the Lonely" (The Motels song), 1982
 "Only the Lonely" (T'Pau song), 1989
 "Only the Lonely", a song by David Gray from Sell, Sell, Sell
 "Only the Lonely", a song by Frank Sinatra from Frank Sinatra Sings for Only the Lonely, 1958
 "Only the Lonely", a song by Unkle from Where Did the Night Fall, 2010

See also 
 "Only Lonely", a song by Bon Jovi
 "Only Lonely" (Tina Arena song)
 "Only Lonely", a song by Hootie & the Blowfish from Musical Chairs
 You're Only Lonely, an album by J. D. Souther
 "You're Only Lonely" (song), the title song